"Be Faithful" is a song performed by American rapper Fatman Scoop, featuring and produced by American hip hop duo the Crooklyn Clan. The song became a sleeper hit, originally released in March 1999 but seeing international chart success after a re-release in October 2003. "Be Faithful" topped the charts in Ireland and the United Kingdom and peaked within the top 10 of the charts in Australia and Denmark. The song was featured in the trailer for the film The Best Man and later in the film Save the Last Dance.

The song heavily samples "Love Like This" by Faith Evans, which in turn is made of a covered loop from Chic's "Chic Cheer". It also samples "Party Ain't a Party" by Queen Pen, "Off the Books" by The Beatnuts, "Can I Get A..." by Jay-Z, "Hip Hop Hooray" by Naughty by Nature and "The Choice Is Yours (Revisited)" by Black Sheep.

Two decades after its release, the song re-gained attention in 2018 after Australian Prime Minister Scott Morrison posted a tweet, containing footage of Parliament set to an excerpt of the song. It was criticized for its inappropriate lyrics and potential breach of laws on the use of Parliamentary footage.

Track listings

US 12-inch single (1999) and Australian CD single (2000)
 "Be Faithful" (clean)
 "Be Faithful" (dirty)

UK and Australasian CD single (2003)
 "Be Faithful" (dirty version) – 2:45
 "Be Faithful" (Highpass vocal remix) – 5:45
 "Be Faithful" (Highpass FM remix) – 3:16
 "Be Faithful" (video CD-ROM)

UK 12-inch single (2003)
A1. "Be Faithful" (dirty version) – 2:45
A2. "Be Faithful" (Highpass FM remix) – 3:16
B1. "Be Faithful" (Highpass vocal remix) – 5:45

UK cassette single (2003)
 "Be Faithful" (dirty version) – 2:45
 "Be Faithful" (Highpass vocal remix) – 5:45
 "Be Faithful" (Highpass FM remix) – 3:16European CD single (2003) "Be Faithful" (dirty version) – 2:45
 "Be Faithful" (Highpass vocal remix) – 5:45Italian 12-inch single (2003)'''
A1. "Be Faithful" (dirty version) – 2:45
A2. "Be Faithful" (Highpass vocal remix) – 5:26
B1. "Be Faithful" (Highpass dub remix) – 5:30
B2. "Be Faithful" (clean version) – 2:42

Charts

Weekly charts

Year-end charts

Certifications

Release history

References

Fatman Scoop songs
1999 singles
1999 songs
2003 singles
Animated music videos
Def Jam Recordings singles
Irish Singles Chart number-one singles
Mercury Records singles
Number-one singles in Scotland
Songs written by Bernard Edwards
Songs written by Faith Evans
Songs written by Fatman Scoop
Songs written by Nile Rodgers
Songs written by Sean Combs
UK Singles Chart number-one singles